Antoinette Roberte Sophie Wilhelmine (7 October 1899 – 31 July 1954), commonly referred to as Antonia, was the last Crown Princess of Bavaria before World War II. By birth, she was a member of the Luxembourgish House of Nassau-Weilburg as the child of Guillaume IV, Grand Duke of Luxembourg and Infanta Marie Anne of Portugal. Antoina was a survivor of the Sachsenhausen concentration camp.

Family

Born at Schloss Hohenburg, at Lenggries in Upper Bavaria, Antonia was the fourth daughter of Guillaume IV, Grand Duke of Luxembourg, who reigned between 1905 and 1912, and Marie Anne, a princess of the Portuguese House of Braganza.

She was the younger sister of two successive grand duchesses: Marie-Adélaïde and Charlotte.  In the family she was called "Toni".

Marriage and children

Antonia became the second wife of Rupprecht, Crown Prince of Bavaria.  The two were engaged on 26 August 1918.  At the time, Rupprecht was Generalfeldmarschall in the Imperial German army, and had successfully commanded the German Sixth Army at the Battle of Lorraine.  

This led to criticism of the close ties between the Luxembourgish Grand Ducal Family and the royalty of the German Empire at a time when Luxembourg was occupied by Germany. This added to the pressure already on Grand Duchess Marie-Adélaïde, who was forced to abdicate on 10 January 1919. Despite the abdication of her elder sister, and the overthrow of the Kingdom of Bavaria in favour of a republic, the two were married on 7 April 1921 at Schloss Hohenburg.

Antonia and Rupprecht had six children, through whom they have a large number of descendants.
Prince Heinrich Franz Wilhelm of Bavaria (28 March 1922–14 February 1958) he married Anne Marie de Lustrac on 31 July 1951.
Princess Irmingard Marie Josefa of Bavaria (29 May 1923–23 October 2010) she married Prince Ludwig of Bavaria on 20 July 1950. They have three children, five grandchildren and four great-grandchildren.
Princess Editha Marie Gabrielle Anna of Bavaria (16 September 1924 – 4 May 2013) married Tito Tomasso Maria Brunetti on 12 November 1946. They had three daughters, five grandchildren and four great-grandchildren. She remarried Professor Gustav Christian Schimert on 29 December 1959. They have three sons and six grandchildren.
Princess Hilda Hildegard Marie Gabriele of Bavaria (24 March 1926 – 5 May 2002) married Juan Bradstock Edgart Lockett de Loayza on 12 February 1949. They had four children and four grandchildren.
Princess Gabriele Adelgunde Marie Theresia Antonia of Bavaria (10 May 1927 – 19 April 2019) married Karl Emmanuel Herzog von Croÿ, later 14th Duke of Croÿ on 17 June 1953. They have three children and ten grandchildren.
Princess Sophie Marie Therese of Bavaria (born 1935) married Jean, 12th Duke of Arenberg on 18 January 1955. They have five children, eleven grandchildren and one great-granddaughter.

Later life

As opponents of the Nazi regime, Antonia and Rupprecht were forced into exile in the Kingdom of Italy in 1939.  From there, they moved to the Kingdom of Hungary.  When Germany occupied Hungary in October 1944, Antonia and her children were captured, while Rupprecht, still in Italy, evaded arrest.  They were imprisoned at Sachsenhausen.  In early April 1945, they were moved to Dachau concentration camp. Although liberated that same month, the imprisonment greatly impaired Antonia's health; the ordeal led to her vow never to return to German soil, and she died nine years later, at Lenzerheide, Graubünden, Switzerland.

Titles and honours

Titles
7 October 1899 – 7 April 1921: Her Grand Ducal Highness Princess Antonia of Luxembourg
7 April 1921 - 18 October 1921: Her Royal Highness The Crown Princess of Bavaria
18 October 1921 - 31 July 1954: Her Royal Highness Crown Princess Antonia of Bavaria, Princess of Luxembourg

National
 : Knight Grand Cross of the Order of the Gold Lion of the House of Nassau
 : Grand Cross of the Order of Adolphe of Nassau
  Bavaria: Dame Grand Cross of the Military Merit Order
  Bavaria: Grand Mistress of the Order of Theresa
  Bavaria: Grand Mistress of the Order of Saint Elizabeth

Foreign
 : Dame of the Order of the Starry Cross
  Germany/Prussia: Dame of the Order of Louise

Ancestry

Footnotes

Bibliography

 Schlim, Jean Louis. Antonia von Luxemburg: Bayerns letzte Kronprinzessin. München: LangenMüller, 2006. .
 

1899 births
1954 deaths
People from Bad Tölz-Wolfratshausen
House of Nassau-Weilburg
House of Wittelsbach
Luxembourgian royalty
Bavarian princesses
Luxembourgian women in World War I
Luxembourgian people imprisoned abroad
Sachsenhausen concentration camp survivors
Dachau concentration camp survivors
German expatriates in Hungary
German expatriates in Switzerland
Daughters of monarchs